Gonzalo Padro (born 13 June 1983 in Tucumán, Argentina) is an Argentine-born Italian rugby union player. He plays as a lock and as a number eight.

Padro previously played for Rugby Rovigo, Biarritz Olympique, Petrarca Padova and Benetton Treviso. Gonzalo plays in the back or second row.

In 2007 Gonzalo won the Top 14 with Biarritz. He joined Benetton Treviso for the 2010-2011 season. He signed for new Italian club Viadana for the 2012/13 season.

References

External links
ERC Profile (archived link)

Living people
1983 births
Argentine rugby union players
Italian rugby union players
Benetton Rugby players
Rugby Rovigo Delta players
Rugby Viadana players
Biarritz Olympique players
Rugby union locks
Rugby union number eights
Sportspeople from Tucumán Province